Modern-day Marseille's cultural diversity is reflected in the wide variety of religious beliefs of its citizens.

Christianity 
There were 850,000 Christians in Marseille as of 2010.

Catholicism 
The Roman Catholic Archdiocese of Marseille is a metropolitan archdiocese of the Latin Church of the Roman Catholic church in France. The Archepiscopal see is in the city of Marseille, and the diocese comprises the arrondissement of Marseille, a subdivision of the department of Bouches-du-Rhône in the region of Provence-Alpes-Côte d'Azur.

In 2013 there were 715,000 Catholics in Marseille, forming 68.2% of the total population of the diocese.

Eastern Orthodox 
In 2013, 10,000 people living in Marseille identified themselves as Eastern Orthodox.

Armenian Apostolic Church 
In 2013, 80,000 people living in Marseille identified themselves as Armenian Apostolic Church.

European immigration to Marseille 
In 2014 the National Institute of Statistics and Economic Studies (INSEE, for its acronym in French) published a study, according to which the number of Italians, Portuguese and Spaniards in the south of Marseille has doubled between 2009 and 2012.
According to the French Institute, this increase resulting from the financial crisis that hit several European countries in that period, has pushed up the number of Europeans installed in the south of Marseille.
Statistics on Spanish immigrants in France show a growth of 107 percent between 2009 and 2012, i.e. in this period went from 5,300 to 11,000 people.

Pentecostals
In Marseille live also a growing number of Pentecostal Christians. The majority of them are immigrants from sub-Saharan Africa.

Islam 
As official data on religion are generally not collected in France on the principle of secularism ("laïcité"), the precise number of Muslims in Marseille is not available. Various sources estimate Muslims to constitute 20% of the city's population. A survey of high-school students carried out in 2000–2001 suggests that 30% of young people have a Muslim background. In 2015, The Guardian reported that were 250,000 Muslims in Marseille.

In Marseille, there are seven halal abattoirs during Eid al-Adha, 73 prayer spaces, including 10 in the city center.

Unlike in some other parts of France, Muslim minorities live within city limits, often side-by-side with the native population. A 2008 study concluded that French children of North African descent in Marseille were three times as likely to have friends of a different ethnic background as anywhere else in France. 

A sizable minority of 32% Muslims in Marseille were born in France. Muslim immigrants to the city are mostly from the Maghreb and Comoro Islands. Muslims are particularly concentrated in the North districts ("quartiers Nord"), in the working-class districts of the city.

Religiosity 
According to a 2011 survey, three-quarters of the Muslims in Marseille considered themselves actively observant Muslims, one-quarter responded no, and 3% of respondents declined to answer. Of those who considered themselves actively observant, 40% stated that they prayed, and 11% added that they attended a mosque on a regular basis. The intensity of religious practice was not gender-related; a few more women indicated they actively practised (39%, in comparison with 35% of men).

History

Second World War 
In August 1944, Marseille was liberated from the Germans by the 3rd Algerian Infantry Division, supported by Moroccan Goumier's. The 3rd Algerian Infantry Division, under the command of General de Monsabert, was made up of about 60% Arabs from North Africa (mostly Algerian Tirailleurs). According to John Gimlette, "the Arabs from North Africa who liberated Marseille still inhabit the city, less now in body than spirit".

Immigration to Marseille 
Muslim immigration from the Maghreb (Algeria, Morocco, Tunisia) started to increase in the 1970s. Marseille's population of Algerian descent is estimated to be at least 150,000. Over the last 30 years, the city has become the main destination for Comorians immigrants. As of 2014, there is approximately 61,700 Turks also living in Marseille.

Judaism 
The Museum of the Jewish People at Beit Hatfutsot estimated that around 80,000 Jews lived in Marseille in 2013, comprising just under 10% of the city's population. The majority of Marseille's Jewish families live in the areas of St. Marguerite, Parc Fleuri, and La Rose. In 2017,  Marseille had the third-largest Jewish population of any urban center in Europe. There are around 50 synagogues in the country, 47 of which are Orthodox.

References

Sources